Dan West, also known as d'Animal, is an American rock and jazz musician, songwriter and producer, and one half of the duo LoveyDove.

Early life and influences 

West was raised in the San Fernando Valley, California. From an early age, his older cousins would give him their records of The Beatles, The Monkees, Paul Revere and The Raiders whose music inspired him to ask his father for a guitar at the age of 7 years old. He was told by his father James Douglass West, a television writer for Lassie and Wonderful World of Disney and a former musician, that he had to learn the piano for one year before receiving a guitar, which he did. He then acquired a drum set after being inspired by the Gene Krupa and Buddy Rich drum battle album on Verve.

West had mastered several instruments by the time he was a young adolescent. Prior to performing in Los Angeles rock clubs before he was old enough to drink there, he would routinely form bands and play at backyard parties. He cites the "creative atmosphere" in which he was raised as formative to his career, and is known for his versatility as "a multi-instrumentalist (who) shifts from genre to genre with a dazzling agility". West now plays the piano, bass, guitar, drums, cello, upright bass, flute, clarinet, composes for orchestra and big band, and does music programming.

The LA Times described his music as "a flexible sound where Boyce & Hart bubblegum shimmer collides with shadowy-psych-garage menace, and his lyrics – whether delivering messages of loss, insecurity or ardent passion – draws the listener in, conjuring a relatable immediacy, which in turn extrapolates itself within the performer-audience equation to create a singularly intimate atmosphere." He was also noted as "a master of the pop idiom, one who is able to link Bing Crosby to Sky Saxon and Brian Wilson." West notes Paul McCartney, James Jamerson, and Carol Kaye as influential when writing music, in particular the bass part of a track. He also cites Pete Townshend, Lenny Breau, Ted Greene, Syd Barrett, Jimi Hendrix, Edward Van Halen, Wes Montgomery, John Entwistle, Scott LaFaro, Melanie, Jane Weaver, Gil Evans, Billy Strayhdorn, Bill Evans, and Clare Fischer as influential musicians.

Career

Solo albums 
West has also released solo albums Hot Corners, Does It Suit You?, the EP Expression Compression as part of US label Silber Records' "5 in 5" conceptual series of EPs, and d'Animal l'Ogic.

Chad Keller of love/hate Magazine called West's debut solo album Hot Corners: "Chunky and emotional, with traces of trippy Brit rock. Beautiful sounds that are raw and real in an era of over-filtered, pop-fodder." Johnny Whiteside of LA Weekly gave a rave review: "Never flashy, always genuine, Dan West is a pop stylist of rare quality, one whose originality and intimate involvement with music guarantees any listener soul-deep satisfaction." The album features tracks Lifeless, Everywhere I Go, One Kiss, U & I, We R I, Never Go Away, The Sprawling Sun, LA Story, Never No, Always Yes, Silicon, Zombie Girl, Another Way, Wasting Time, Bedroom Revolution, and Is This Really Anything?

His second album Does It Suit You? also garnered high praise, with Keller calling it: "Innocent, psychedelic, poetic and highly addictive. A fun-loving fusion of the best parts of Blur, Tame Impala, and Beck all rolled into one free-spirited sound from the depths of the human heart." It features the tracks Does It Suit You?, I Was Never Here, Distractions, Falling Upward, Make Tomorrow A Better Day, The Valley's Gone, Higher, The Garden of Life, We're Satisfied, Krunkle Kanyon, She Strikes A Pose, Digging into You, Azalia's in Bloom, Never Thought I'd Find, and Gregorian Byrds.

LA Weekly describes West as "a multifaceted, ferociously gifted musician." He has toured the US, Europe, and Australasia.

In January 2017, West released his third solo album d'Animal l'Ogic. It received positive reviews from multiple media outlets, describing it as "a good example of the power of genuine musical originality to really shake things up," "an on the button rush of kaleidoscopic euphoria," and "a vivid and ornate LP." The genre is described as "a modern take on psychedelic rock".

On September 18, 2020, Dan West under his d’Animal moniker, released the first single from his upcoming 2021 full length album, ‘Hedonistic Pillow.’ The song is entitled ‘Falipa’ which is the name of his cat for over 19 years who died on June 8, 2020. The song is a loving, heartfelt tribute to his beloved feline friend. The video for the song was directed by Azalia Snail and received an official premiere in the October 12, 2020 edition of The Big Takeover.

Collaborations 
West has performed on stage and on record with notable artists including Sky Saxon of The Seeds, Bryan Maclean of Love, Rosemary Clooney, Maynard Ferguson, and Paula Kelly. He has fronted for the bands Aguafantastica, Sidewalk Society and LoveyDove. He scored the music for the documentary Mr. Movie Poster which follows the life of artist Paul Crifo.

At the age of 7, West met iconic pianist Eubie Blake at a performance at Dorsey High School. Blake, along with Scott Joplin, introduced West to the ragtime style of jazz and piano playing that they invented. He was then introduced to Frank Zappa in his first-grade class, whose children attended the same school. At the age of 13, West performed in his band The Caterpillars at Johnny Otis' church alongside the iconic Los Angeles musician. His career then took off during his teenage years in the psych-pop underground of the 1980s while performing with Sky Saxon, Bryan Maclean and his band Threw the Lookinglass, who played opening sets for Red Hot Chili Peppers and Fishbone. Threw the Lookinglass released a self-titled vinyl EP. West promptly made his name in a scene known as The Paisley Underground, which is known for The Bangles, its ties to Mazzy Star, and Prince naming his label Paisley Park Records after the movement.

In the 1990s, West delved into the melodic and harmonic possibilities of jazz, studying with composer and arranger Clare Fischer, pianist Terry Trotter, and guitarist Ted Greene. He graduated from Cal State Northridge with a degree in Composition and Piano Performance. He then performed as pianist for Maynard Ferguson, Della Reese, Joe Williams and Lionel Hampton, and performed and arranged music for LA swing stalwarts The Speakeasy Spies Big Band and The Jazz Butchers.

West, as keyboardist, toured the US and Canada with El Vez in 1998, in addition to playing keyboards on his album Boxing With God which was released on Sympathy for the Record Industry in 2001.

In the 2000s, West returned to his rock roots and began a steady release of albums in collaboration with Aguafantastica, Sidewalk Society. and LoveyDove.

Sidewalk Society, a band from Long Beach, California, who are described as "obvious anglophiles", "the USA's best interpreters of 60s UK sounds", and "plenty of contemporary punch", was credited for "writing in the musical languages of their influences without sounding like mere copyists" on their album Venus, Saturn and the Crescent Moon. Following their self-titled album in 2008, they released a limited edition 7-inch vinyl album in 2010 for the vinyl-only UK label Fruits de Mer Records after the label discovered their cover of Small Faces' Song of a Baker and asked them to contribute a track to their first 12-inch compilation before going on to record their EP. In 2017, they released the album Strange Roads: The Songs of Rolled Gold.

LoveyDove is a duo formed by West and Azalia Snail in 2011, known for being "as visually interesting as they are sonically enjoyable." West and Snail are a real-life couple who married on April 25, 2014, and credit their success to being on the same page musically and the fact that they love playing music together. Their first self-titled album was released in the US by LA's Fine and praised by L.A. Record as, "Not since Wings wrote "Silly Love Songs" has a couple captured a love so sugary and yet so recognizable to those who have ever tasted the good stuff.

Their second album Showstopper was released in both New Zealand by Powertool Records and the US by Records Ad Nauseam and received rave reviews. LA Weekly wrote, "With their new album, Showstopper, a 13-bombon blast of harmonious psych-pop confections, the local (duo) have outdone themselves. Sweet, savory, gorgeously rendered and painstakingly arranged, every track is a masterly example of their complex bubble-gum simplicity – a cunning, stunning contradiction that reliably engages the brain as it reaches deep into the soul. It's an approach the pair has long since perfected, but on Showstopper, it's displayed in even fuller, richer form than ever before." L.A Record called the album "an eclectic and electrically exciting blend of excellent songwriting and pinpoint precise production, with melodies to live by and a dance beat to die for!". LoveyDove has performed live at venues around Los Angeles and West has been noted as having "a warm and engaging presence" and being "a talented and versatile guitarist."

Snail Meets West, released by Union Pole in 2015, is the free jazz duo of indie mainstay Azalia Snail and psychedelic maestro Dan West. Both have a long resume of various pop and roll projects, including LoveyDove. Snail Meets West is a tribute to the late free jazz pioneer Ornette Coleman who influenced many musicians. Snail plays drums and West plays piano.

LoveyDove toured New Zealand with John S. Hall and King Missile IV in February 2015. LoveyDove and d'Animal did a headlining tour of Europe from October 20 to November 12, 2015. They performed in the UK, France, Spain, the Netherlands, and Germany.

The duo also recorded a track in support of US presidential candidate Bernie Sanders titled Bernie's Air.

In 2017, Sidewalk Society released the album Strange Roads. The album was released on gold vinyl as a reworking of the complete album Rolled Gold by the 1960s band The Action. It received praise from multiple media outlets, including New Untouchables Magazine, who stated, "The arrangements are superb, the production is top drawer and in short, they have made an excellent album." It was also described as "a truly extraordinary listening event" which "[captures] the essence of Brit psych pop infused with the West Coast sound of The Byrds and The Association."

In 2018 West turned his attention to producing and arranging, producing albums for Azalia Snail (Neon Resistance, Silber Records, 2018), the debut album from LA group Frieda’s Roses (Jessica Triangle, Mika Records, 2019) and You, Me & This Fuckin’ Guy (Garden Variety Fuckers, Dromedary Records, 2019). In addition to these projects, Dan has also produced several singles for Mystery Rose including her latest release ‘Sunset Boulevard’ which features a video produced by video director Steve Hanft (Beck, Elliott Smith, Insane Clown Posse). Mystery Rose has charted on music sites in the US and UK. Both Mystery Rose and Lexx And The Roadzies (another of Dan’s production projects) have been featured frequently on DJ Rodney Bingenheimer’s ‘The Rodney Bingenheimer Show’ (Little Steven’s Underground Garage on SiriusXM.) West has also begun arranging a series of big band charts for saxophonist Jeff Pifher’s contemporary jazz ensemble ‘Socrates’ Trial.’ Dan’s first installment, an arrangement of the groups ‘Past Realities’ was completed in April of 2020.

Discography

References

External links 

Dan West SoundCloud
Dan West Official Website
Dan West Bandcamp
LoveyDove Official Website
Azalia Snail, Neon Resistance’ Reviews/References  http://www.silbermedia.com/azaliasnail/NeonResistance.shtml  https://thokeitapes.bandcamp.com/album/azalia-snail-neon-resistance-mc  http://www.beachsloth.com/azalia-snail-neon-resistance.html  https://abstractanalogue.tumblr.com/post/171091792159/azalia-snail-neonresistance-  interview
Frieda’s Roses, ‘Jessica Triangle’ Reviews/References  https://bigtakeover.com/news/VideoPremiereJessicaTrianglebyFriedasRoses  https://statiknoizeblog.wordpress.com/2019/06/30/feature-review-friedas-rosesjessica-triangle/
You, Me & This Fuckin’ Guy, ‘Garden Variety Fuckers’ Reviews/References  http://bigtakeover.com/news/SongPremiereFBIbyYouMeandThisFuckinGuy  https://dromedaryrecords.bandcamp.com/album/garden-variety-fuckers  https://daggerzine.tumblr.com/post/624300378074333184/you-me-and-thisfuckin-guy-garden-variety
Mystery Rose Singles Reviews/References  Website  Facebook  Youtube  Spotify
Lexx And The Roadzies Singles Reviews/References  Facebook  Bancamp  https://hellogoodbyeshow.com/tag/lexx-and-the-roadzies/
Jeff Peiffer & Socrates’ Trial References  https://jeffpifher.com/news/2019/12/1/past-realities-for-big-band
The Big Takeover: http://bigtakeover.com/news/VideoPremiereFalipabydAnimal

Living people
Musicians from California
Singers from Los Angeles
Year of birth missing (living people)
Fruits de Mer Records artists